"Taking Back Control" is a single by the rock band Sparta. It is one of their most well-known songs and the first single from the album Threes. The song was a chart success, performing decently on both Billboard's Alternative Songs and Mainstream Rock chart.

It has been featured in the video game Madden NFL 07 (titled as "Future Needs") and the movie The Invisible.

Background 
A demo version of the song, titled "Future Needs", was included on the Madden NFL 07 soundtrack; this version features different lyrics and a changed chorus.

Track listing

Chart performance

References

2006 singles
2006 songs
Sparta (band) songs
EMI Records singles
Hollywood Records singles